Dietrich Klagges (1 February 1891 – 12 November 1971) was a Nazi Party politician and from 1933 to 1945 the appointed premier (Ministerpräsident) of the now abolished Free State of Brunswick.  He also went by the pseudonym Rudolf Berg.

He is responsible for giving Adolf Hitler citizenship of Germany in 1932.

Youth and early career 

Klagges was the youngest of a forest ranger's seven children. He underwent training as a volksschule teacher at the teaching seminary at Soest. He enrolled for military service in the 15th Infantry Regiment, headquartered in Minden, but was injured and discharged with a partial disability. He then worked as a teacher in Harpen near Bochum. After the First World War broke out, he re-enlisted in the 13th Infantry Regiment on 15 January 1915. He saw action on the western front but was badly wounded with a gunshot wound to the right thigh on 1 April 1915. He saw no further action and, after release from the hospital, was discharged on 31 July 1916. He returned to teaching, this time in Wilster in Holstein.

In 1918 he joined the German National People's Party (DNVP) and stayed with the party until 1924. After leaving the DNVP, Klagge was for a short time a member of the extreme right-wing German Völkisch Freedom Party (Deutschvölkische Freiheitspartei), which had been founded late in 1922. He soon left it, eventually joining the NSDAP on 13 June 1925 (membership number 7,646). From 1926 until 1930 he worked as a deputy headmaster at a middle school in Benneckenstein (now in Saxony-Anhalt), where from 1928 to 1930 he also served as the Ortsgruppenleiter of the Party's local branch. Because of his membership in the Party, he was dismissed from the Prussian school service and stripped of his pension. In the same year, he first rose to prominence in Braunschweig, where he busied himself as a Nazi propaganda speechmaker.

Writings 
From 1921 on, Klagges was busy writing völkisch, antidemocratic, and anti-Semitic writings which appeared in right-wing newspapers and the like. He wrote for example for Die völkische Schule or Deutschlands Erneuerung and was himself the publisher of the magazine Nordlicht. His partly theological publications were moulded by radical religious racism.

Nazi political offices in Brunswick 
In the Landtag election in the state of Brunswick on 14 September 1930, the Nazi party emerged as the third strongest party, and entered into a coalition government with other conservative parties, including the German National People's Party.

Regierungsrat

On 1 January 1931 Klagges was appointed Regierungsrat (Government Counselor), a lower ranked government official, in the Education Ministry by Anton Franzen, the Nazi Interior and Education Minister of the Brunswick Free State. After long political quarrels and intrigues, however, Franzen had to step down only a few months later, and this triggered an internal political crisis in the Free State, threatening a coalition breakdown.

State Minister of the Interior and Education
Owing to the imminent crisis, Adolf Hitler personally intervened in the matter and gave the German National People's Party an ultimatum that, in the end, led to Klagges being appointed as State Minister for the Interior and Education in the Brunswick State Government on 15 September 1931. Shortly thereafter, in 1932, Klagges also became a member of the Reichstag. He would remain a Reichstag deputy until the end of the Nazi regime, first from electoral constituency 15, East Hanover, and after November 1933 from electoral constituency 16, South Hanover-Brunswick. Already in 1931, two years before the Nazis seized power, Klagges imposed professional bans against Social Democrats and Jews in the civil service, which struck, among others, many teaching staff at the Braunschweig Technical College.

Naturalizing Adolf Hitler 
The City of Braunschweig bears the stigma of being responsible for the former Austrian citizen – and since 1925, at his instigation, stateless person – Adolf Hitler's getting his first official job on 25 February 1932. He was made a Regierungsrat (low-rank government official) at the Braunschweig State Culture and Surveying Office, stationed as a staff member of the Braunschweig legation in Berlin. This had the effect of granting Hitler German citizenship. The city itself, however, played no role in his "naturalization"; rather, it was the Free State government, in whose name this deed was done by the State Minister for the Interior and Education, namely NSDAP member Dietrich Klagges.

Unlike in the City of Braunschweig, by 1930, the Nazis were already quite politically influential in the Brunswick Free State. For Hitler, an appointment to a government office in Braunschweig was the only opportunity to obtain German citizenship, since the Free State was the only state in the Weimar Republic with Nazis in government who could influence and control the Führer's naturalization.

For this reason, the Free State's government – or more precisely its State Minister, Klagges – was given the direct request by the NSDAP party leadership for Hitler's naturalization. Joseph Goebbels referred to the matter in his diary on 4 February 1932: "The intention is to appoint the Führer an associate professor."

Professor Hitler 
Klagges first tried to procure for Hitler an associate professorship in the made-up discipline of "Politics and Organic Sociology" at the Braunschweig Technical College. This plan soon leaked out to the public and then failed miserably in the face of opposition from, among others, the technical college's own leadership and educators themselves. (The now-renamed University of Braunschweig did not want someone who had never finished school.) The plan had to be dropped.

Without meaning to, Klagges had given the Nazi Party the very thing that they had wanted to avoid at all costs: their intentions had now been made public and Hitler had become a target of ridicule. Moreover, Hitler's reputation had been damaged – and not only in Braunschweig – and Klagges would later get the "bill" for it.

Regierungsrat Hitler 
There followed yet another attempt to get Hitler a government job, this time by Dr. Wessels, a German People's Party (DVP) Member of the Reichstag, who suggested that a post be procured for Hitler in the Brunswick Legation at the Reichsrat in Berlin. This second try met with success in the end: On 25 February 1932, Hitler was successfully sworn in, making Hitler a citizen of Brunswick, and thus of Germany. At the same time, he won the right to stand as a candidate in the 1932 Reich presidential election.

In the Braunschweigische Landeszeitung newspaper, Klagges declared a short time later:
"If our participation in the government in Braunschweig had had no further success than procuring citizenship for our Führer' ' Adolf Hitler, then this fact alone is enough to prove the necessity of our participation in the government."

Hitler's job at the legation did not last long. On 16 February 1933 the new Reichskanzler requested in a short telegram discharge from the Brunswick State Service, which was promptly granted "effective immediately".

 Break between Hitler and Klagges 
Hitler's naturalization was supposed to be dealt with quickly and above all, inconspicuously, without the public getting any knowledge of it. However, with Klagges's clumsy way of doing things, the whole business grew into a farce for the later "Führer", since the first attempt failed miserably, and publicly. Only on the second try was the coup successful.

Hitler never forgave Klagges this public exposure and personal humiliation and settled the score with him on 17 July 1935 on his last visit to Braunschweig, which resulted in Klagges's de facto disempowerment. Henceforth, Klagges was to submit all plans to Reichsstatthalter Wilhelm Loeper in Dessau as well as Reichsminister Hanns Kerrl for approval, thereby being degraded to provincial politician and thrust off the stage of higher NSDAP politics. It is also likely that Klagges had only Hermann Göring's backing to thank for not being dismissed by Hitler on the spot.

 Ministerpräsident and SS officer
On 6 May 1933, Klagges was appointed Ministerpräsident of the Free State of Brunswick by Reichsstatthalter Wilhelm Loeper. Klagges's formulated goal was the creation of a National Socialist model state. Only a few days later, the first book burnings took place in Braunschweig at the Schlossplatz. On 2 October 1933, Klagges was named to Hans Frank's Academy for German Law at its inaugural meeting. Klagges joined the Schutzstaffel (SS) on 27 January 1934 with the rank of SS-Gruppenführer and was posted to the staff of the 49th Standarte. On 1 April 1936, he was assigned to the staff of the Reichsführer-SS, and was promoted to SS-Obergruppenführer on 30 January 1942.

 Nazi state model 
Klagges's plans for a Nazi model state entailed the goal of further keeping Brunswick as independent as possible from Berlin's overlordship so that he could go on running his little "Reich" as he deemed fit, doing whatever he liked to do. For Brunswick was a small state, and part of Gau Southern Hanover-Brunswick, composed largely of the Prussian Province of Hanover and controlled by powerful Gauleiter Bernhard Rust. Klagges would not hear of his state being integrated into Prussia – as this would have put an end to his independence – despite Hitler's assurances that Brunswick would still be a cultural centre, and not merely part of a new proposed "Reichsgau Hannover." To hold onto – and broaden – his own power, Klagges next tried to bring into being a new Gau – one that would be independent of Hanover. It would include not only Brunswick but also the two Regierungsbezirks of Lüneburg and Hildesheim and would be called "Gau Ostfalen." Its capital would be Braunschweig and the Gauleiter would be, of course, himself. Klagges found support for his idea among Braunschweig educators, from the middle class, the chamber of commerce, and even the Protestant Church. Despite his efforts, his plan came to nothing and the administrative status quo remained.

During his tenure, Klagges undertook several steps to strengthen Braunschweig's political and economic position in Germany: as of June 1933, a new suburb of Braunschweig, the "Dietrich Klagges Garden City" (Gartenstadt Dietrich Klagges) was built. Furthermore, he brought many important Nazi institutions to the city, such as the Academy for Youth Leadership (Akademie für Jugendführung), the German Research Centre for Aviation (Deutsche Versuchsanstalt für Luftfahrt), the Führer School for German Trades and Crafts (Führerschule des deutschen Handwerks), the Regional Führer School of the Hitler Youth (Gebietsführerschule der Hitler-Jugend), the Luftwaffe Command 2, the Reich Hunting Lodge (Reichsjägerhof, intended to impress passionate hunter Göring), the SS Ensigns' School (SS-Junkerschule), the SS Upper Division "Middle", and also the Bernhard Rust College for Teacher Training.

Klagges also further developed Braunschweig's infrastructure by connecting it to the newly built Autobahn and the Mittellandkanal. In the end, thanks to Klagges, Braunschweig also became a centre of the National Socialist armament industry, since important industrial hubs were growing right nearby, namely the Reichswerke Hermann Göring in Salzgitter (on whose board of directors Klagges was as of 1937), and the Volkswagen Works in Fallersleben (now part of Wolfsburg).

 Persecuting political dissenters 
What follows is a few examples of how and by what means Dietrich Klagges persecuted politically undesirable persons (or had them persecuted), sometimes to death (see also "Klagge trials" below).

 The Rieseberg Murders 

A short time after the Nazis' seizure of power, the first acts of terror were seen in both the City of Braunschweig and throughout the state of Brunswick, in which the so-called "Hilfspolizei" ("Auxiliary Police") were involved. This force was directly answerable to Klagges and consisted of SA, SS and Der Stahlhelm men. Their actions were aimed mainly at members of various labour organizations, the SPD, the KPD, and Jews. They were carried out with extraordinary brutality. Klagges was therefore responsible for at least 25 Nazi régime opponents' deaths.
The murder of eleven communists and labour organisers in Rieseberg (about 15 miles east of Braunschweig) by members of the SS on 4 July 1933 was the most important of these events. There was to have been a judicial inquiry into the circumstances of the arrestees' deaths, but Klagges assisted in blocking and suppressing it.

 Ernst Böhme 

Lawyer and SPD member  (1892–1968) was from 1929 until 1933 the democratically elected Mayor of the City of Braunschweig.

After the Nazis had risen to power, however, he found himself the target of growing repressive measures and ever greater persecution by Klagges, who on 13 March 1933 ordered Böhme's ouster and had him taken to the disused AOK Building, which was being used by the Nazis as a "protective custody" prison, as they called it. Böhme had the dedication of former Brunswick Ministerpräsident Heinrich Jasper (who had likewise been persecuted by Klagges) to thank for the return of his freedom a short time later.

Shortly thereafter, however, Böhme was once again arrested and this time is taken to the SPD's own, but now disused, Volksfreundhaus where he was mishandled. He was forced to sign a document declaring that he had given up his mandate. After he was let go, Böhme left Braunschweig and came back only in 1945.

On 1 June 1945, Ernst Böhme was given back his mayoralty by the United States military administration. He stayed on as mayor until 17 December 1948.

 Heinrich Jasper 

Lawyer and SPD member Heinrich Jasper (1875–1945) was, among other things, a city councillor since 1903, an SPD factional chairman in Brunswick's Landtag, member of the Weimar National Assembly as well as Brunswick State Minister between 1919 and 1930 and several times the Brunswick Free State's premier.

Jasper was, at Klagges's instigation, taken into "protective custody" on pretences on 17 March 1933, and taken to the AOK Building, where he was severely beaten in an attempt to force him to resign his political mandate, which Jasper, however, would not do. He was next taken to the Volksfreundhaus where he faced further mishandling until his temporary release on 19 April.

On 26 June 1933, Jasper was once again arrested and taken to Dachau concentration camp, from which he was released in 1939 under circumstances that have yet to be explained. Jasper then returned to Braunschweig where he was placed under constant surveillance and had to report daily to the Gestapo.

The failed attempt on Hitler's life at the Wolf's Lair in East Prussia on 20 July 1944 furnished another pretense on which to arrest Jasper yet again on 22 August 1944. After spending time in various concentration camps, he ended up at Bergen-Belsen where he is believed to have died on 19 February 1945 of typhus.

 August Merges 
August Merges (1870–1945) belonged to various leftwing parties, was one of the leaders of the November Revolution in Braunschweig and was President of the Socialist Republic of Brunswick. After 1933 he moved out of active party work and joined the resistance against the Nazi régime.

In April 1935, he was arrested together with other resistance fighters and severely beaten. He was sentenced for high treason but was released early, in 1937, for medical reasons. On Klagges's instructions, he was arrested once more and taken into "protective custody".

After Merges had once more been set free, he was nevertheless repeatedly picked up by the Gestapo and detained for a short time. He died as a result of mishandling suffered at the Gestapo's hands.

 Forced labour and concentration camps 
Beginning on 21 January 1941, Klagges started having Braunschweig's Jews deported to the concentration camps. In 1944, there were 91,000 forced labourers in the Watenstedt-Salzgitter, Braunschweig and Helmstedt area. This was far and away the highest density at labour camps anywhere in the Reich. Indeed, a great number of the people killed in the massive air raid on 15 October 1944 were forced labourers and camp inmates. When US troops occupied Braunschweig on 12 April 1945, there were still 61,000 prisoners in the camps.

 Postwar trials
On 12 April 1945, Klagges was taken prisoner by the American troops thronging into Braunschweig, and in 1946, a military court in Bielefeld sentenced him to six years in labour prison (Zuchthaus) for his crimes.

The new General Prosecutor Fritz Bauer, who had come to Braunschweig in 1950, and who was later active in the 1960s, likewise as a prosecutor, in the Auschwitz Trials, contributed to a great extent to getting Klagges sentenced in a normal criminal trial on 4 April 1950 to a life term in labour prison for crimes committed by him as Brunswick State Minister and Premier, including, among others, the Rieseberg murders.

The Bundesgerichtshof (a federal court), however, overturned this sentence in 1952. In a second trial in which it could be proved that Klagges had taken part in murders, torture, false imprisonment, and so on, and that he had planned (by himself or with others) these deeds, his prison term was reduced to 15 years.

In his defence, Klagges put it to the court that he had known nothing about all that, as he had only worked from a desk and he was deceived by his underlings as to the true extent of the Nazi terror that was being perpetrated.

In 1955, Klagges's wife applied for her husband's early release from prison without further probationary conditions. This first application was rejected, as was another one made the next year. In 1957, however, Klagges was released after having served about 80% of his prison term, and moved with his wife to Bad Harzburg, where he busied himself mainly with editing right-wing writings and maintaining contacts with neo-Nazi groups in Lower Saxony until he died in 1971.

In 1970, the Bundesverwaltungsgericht (another federal court) decided that Klagges had to receive an amount accumulated from his pension as premier (Ministerpräsident), approximately DM 100,000.

 Bibliography (selected) Der Glaube (1926)Kampf dem Marxismus (1930)Die Weltwirtschaftskrise (1930)Reichtum und soziale Gerechtigkeit: Grundfragen einer nationalsozialistischen Volkswirtschaftslehre (1933)Geschichtsunterricht als nationalpolitische Erziehung (1936)An alle Völker der Erde: Die Zukunft der Nationen (1972)

Quotations
"He wants to remain king of an enlarged Braunschweig" (entry in Goebbels's diary from 5 February 1941 about Klagges)
"The hundreds of thousands of foreigners, above all Jews, were impartially acknowledged as having equal rights … Behind everything stood the parasitic Jews' will … to rule the world." (from Klagges's book Geschichtsunterricht als nationalpolitische Erziehung)

See also
List SS-Obergruppenführer

 Cited references 

Literature
Richard Bein: Im deutschen Land marschieren wir. Freistaat Braunschweig 1930–1945. Braunschweig 1984 
Braunschweiger Zeitung (publisher): "Wie braun war Braunschweig? Hitler und der Freistaat Braunschweig" Braunschweig 2003 
Horst-Rüdiger Jarck, Günter Scheel (publishers): Braunschweigisches Biographisches Lexikon. 19. und 20. Jahrhundert, Hanover 1996 
Horst-Rüdiger Jarck, Gerhard Schildt (publishers): Braunschweigische Landesgeschichte. Jahrtausendrückblick einer Region, Braunschweig 2000, 
Helmut Kramer (publisher): Braunschweig unterm Hakenkreuz. Braunschweig 1981 
Karl-Joachim Krause: Braunschweig zwischen Krieg und Frieden. Die Ereignisse vor und nach der Kapitulation der Stadt am 12. April 1945. Braunschweig 1994 

Hans Johann Reinowski: Terror in Braunschweig. Aus dem ersten Quartal der Hitlerherrschaft. Bericht herausgegeben von der Kommission zur Untersuchung der Lage der politischen Gefangenen. Zurich 1933
Ernst-August Roloff: Braunschweig und der Staat von Weimar. Politik, Wirtschaft und Gesellschaft 1918–1933. In: Braunschweiger Werkstücke, Band 31, Braunschweig 1964 
Ernst-August Roloff: Bürgertum und Nationalsozialismus 1930–1933. Braunschweigs Weg ins Dritte Reich. Hanover 1961 
Gunhild Ruben: Bitte mich als Untermieter bei Ihnen anzumelden – Hitler und Braunschweig 1932–1935.'' Norderstedt 2004

External links 
 
 
 Biography of Klagges
 
 

1891 births
1971 deaths
German Army personnel of World War I
German National People's Party politicians
German Völkisch Freedom Party politicians
Holocaust perpetrators in Germany
Members of the Academy for German Law
Members of the Reichstag of Nazi Germany
Members of the Reichstag of the Weimar Republic
Nazi Party officials
Nazi Party politicians
Nazi propagandists
Nazis convicted of war crimes
People from the Province of Westphalia
People from Soest (district)